Pameče is a settlement in the City Municipality of Slovenj Gradec in northern Slovenia. The area is part of the traditional region of Styria. The entire municipality is now included in the Carinthia Statistical Region.

Mass graves
Pameče is the site of two known mass graves associated with the Second World War. They contain the remains of an unidentified number of victims, believed to be mostly Croatians.

Church
The parish church in the settlement is dedicated to Saint James and belongs to the Roman Catholic Archdiocese of Maribor. It was first mentioned in written documents dating to 1488. The current building dates to 1868.  A second church on a hill north of the settlement is dedicated to  Saint Anne and was built in 1530.

References

External links
Pameče at Geopedia

Populated places in the City Municipality of Slovenj Gradec
Slovenj Gradec